Cyperus swartzii, commonly known as Swartz's flatsedge, is a species of sedge that is native to southern parts of North America, northern parts of South America, Central America, and the Caribbean.

See also
List of Cyperus species

References

swartzii
Plants described in 1926
Flora of Mexico
Flora of Cuba
Flora of the Cayman Islands
Flora of the Dominican Republic
Flora of Haiti
Flora of Jamaica
Flora of Venezuela
Flora of Puerto Rico
Taxa named by Johann Otto Boeckeler
Flora without expected TNC conservation status